TripleS (stylized as tripleS; /ˈtɹɪpəl:ɛs/;) is a South Korean girl group formed by MODHAUS. The group was introduced to the public through a pre-debut project that began in May 2022, where each of the 24 members were revealed periodically.

They aim to be the world's first decentralized K-pop idol group. The members will rotate between the group, sub-unit, and solo activities, as chosen by fans as they will be able to participate and communicate with the group such as deciding the sub-units and the content through NFT photo cards called 'Objekts'. The group's concept is the members have the special ability 'S' and that they will join forces and demonstrate their abilities through the 'Dimension' and will be recreated every season with new concepts.

They made their official debut as a group on February 13, 2023 with their extended play (EP) Assemble.

Name
The group name "TripleS" means "The Idol of all Possibilities" and the three S letters stand for "Social, Sonyo, Seoul".

History

Pre-debut activities
Prior to joining MODHAUS, many members were already involved in the entertainment industry. Jeong Hye-rin was a child actress under Kids Planet, making her acting debut in the 2018 web-series Between Us; she also appeared in a commercial for Japanese textbooks. Jeong Hye-rin and Kim Na-kyoung are former P Nation trainees. Lee Ji-woo is a former SM Entertainment, JYP Entertainment, YG Entertainment and FNC Entertainment trainee. Seo Da-hyun was a former Source Music trainee. Kim Soo-min previously auditioned for P Nation and Jellyfish Entertainment. Kaede was a former child model, and she was an exclusive model for the Japanese Magazine Nico☆Puchi until 2019; after she left she became a model for clothing brands Lindiha and LIZLISA

Kim Chae-yeon is a former member of Busters and CutieL as well as an actress and television host for children's television shows Cooking Class, Tok!Tok! Boni Hani, and Quiz Monster. Kim Na-kyoung is the younger sister of Bibi and appeared in the final episode of SBS competition show The Fan. In 2021, Seo Da-hyun appeared on an episode of popular Korean reality web-show Sixth Sense.

Lee Ji-woo and Kim Yoo-yeon are former contestants on the MBC survival show My Teenage Girl. Lee Ji-woo made her acting debut in the web drama I:LOVE:DM and was also the lead actress in the teasers for My Teenage Girl. Lee Ji-woo was eliminated in the sixth round ranking 18th, while Kim Yoo-yeon was eliminated during the final episode placing 8th. Gong Yu-bin was a contestant on the TV Chosun junior cooking show I am Chef, making it to the final Top 3. Kotone and Nien were contestants on the Mnet survival show Girls Planet 999, Kotone was eliminated in the 11th episode, ranking P24 and J09 and Nien was eliminated on the 8th episode ranking C15

2022: Launching of the group and Acid Angel from Asia debut
On February 18, 2022, Modhaus announced that they would be launching the world's first "fan-participating girl group" and that the group was set to start revealing in the first half of the year. The group is led by the CEO Jaden Jeong who worked with companies such as JYP Entertainment, Woollim Entertainment, Sony Music Korea and Blockberry Creative.

The first set of members were revealed every fortnight between May 2022 until September 2022 (in order) Yoon Seo-yeon, Jeong Hye-rin, Lee Ji-woo, Kim Chae-yeon, Kim Yoo-yeon, Kim Soo-min, Kim Na-kyoung, and Gong Yu-bin.

On July 12, 2022, it was announced that TripleS will be collaborating with GS25. GS25 will be selling TripleS collaboration set products and offline photocards during the second half of 2022.

On August 8, 2022, TripleS released their official app Cosmo, as well their first bundle of digital photocards which are changed into an NFT token to vote in future events on the app.

On September 16, 2022, it was announced that TripleS will start to prepare for sub-unit debut activities, the two sub-units including Acid Angel from Asia and +(KR)ystal Eyes, with Acid Angel from Asia having their debut activities first in October. Acid Angel from Asia made their official debut on October 28, 2022 with the EP Access. The debut made both commercial and critical success, "Generation" was nominated on SBS M's The Show, and Access reached No. 1 on the iTunes US K-POP album chart.

The second set of members were revealed in November (in order), Kaede and Seo Da-hyun. In November, TripleS announced they would be debuting a 10-member unit during the beginning of 2023. Fans would be able to vote out of 8 songs which song they would want to be the leading track.

On December 28, 2022, TripleS announced they would begin to branch out into Japan in January 2023. The third set of members began to be revealed from January 2023 (in order), Kotone and Kwak Yeon-ji.

2023–present: Official Korean and +(KR)ystal Eyes debut
On February 13, 2023, all of the announced members excluding Kotone and Yeon-ji released TripleS' debut EP, Assemble, with the title track "Rising".

On March 17, 2023, it was confirmed that +(KR)ystal Eyes, the second sub-unit will debut on the first week of May.

Endorsements
On July 12, 2022, TripleS became sponsors for the convenience store GS25.

On November 24, 2022, TripleS partnered with The Sandbox, a virtual world blockchain game, to create a social hub for fan engagements and to host various events in the metaverse; they will release TripleS related NFTs, avatars, wearables, and digital collectible items on the game.

On November 30, 2022, TripleS became a promoter for the Korean fashion website SEOULSTORE.

Members
Adapted from their Naver profile:

 Yoon Seo-yeon
 Jeong Hye-rin
 Lee Ji-woo
 Kim Chae-yeon
 Kim Yoo-yeon
 Kim Soo-min
 Kim Na-kyoung
 Gong Yu-bin
 Kaede
 Seo Da-hyun
 Kotone ; 
 Kwak Yeon-ji
 Nien;

Timeline

Sub-units

 Acid Angel from Asia - Kim Yoo-yeon (leader of sub-unit), Kim Na-kyoung, Gong Yu-bin, Jeong Hye-rin
 +(KR)ystal Eyes - Yoon Seo-yeon, Kim Chae-yeon, Lee Ji-woo, Kim Soo-min

Discography

Extended plays

Singles

Other charted songs

Videography

Music videos

Other videos

Filmography

Web shows

Concerts

Standalone concerts
TripleS : Pre-Con <ASSEMBLE> (2023)

Bibliography

Photobooks

Awards and nominations

References

External links

 

K-pop music groups
South Korean girl groups
South Korean pop music groups
South Korean dance music groups
Musical groups from Seoul
Musical groups established in 2022
2022 establishments in South Korea